Jules Lunteschütz (February 9, 1821March 20, 1893) is a Franco-German portrait painter noted for his portrait of the philosopher Arthur Schopenhauer. He is also known by his given name, Isaak Lunteschütz.

Biography
Lunteschütz was born in February 9, 1821 in Romanswiller and died on March 20, 1893 in Frankfurt. He studied drawing at the "École de dessin Besançon". In 1837 he studied painting under Philipp Veit in Frankfurt, and in 1838 he studied under Jean Alaux at the École des Beaux-Arts in Paris. He exhibited at the Paris Salon from 1851-1867 and was made Chevalier of the Legion of Honour in 1866.

He is best known for his portrait of his friend, the philosopher Arthur Schopenhauer. Gustave Courbet has painted a portrait of Lunteschütz in 1858, which can be found at the Städel art museum in Frankfurt.

Gallery

References 

Lunteschütz, Jules, by Felix Becker, etal. in Allgemeines Lexikon der bildenden Künstler von der Antike bis zur Gegenwart (General Dictionary of Artists from Antiquity to the Present), 1929, volume 23, page 472. E.A. Seemann, Leipzig

19th-century German painters
German male painters
19th-century French painters
French male painters
German portrait painters
French portrait painters
1821 births
1893 deaths
Artists from Besançon
19th-century French male artists